For spouses of the Canadian monarch, see List of Canadian monarchs#Consorts
For spouses of the governor general of Canada, see Viceregal consort of Canada
For spouses of the Canadian prime minister, see Spouse of the Prime Minister of Canada